Northshore Middle School is a public middle school in Bothell, Washington.
Most students go to Inglemoor High School after graduating from NMS, as it is commonly referred to. The feeders schools are Arrowhead Elementary, Woodmoor Elementary, and Moorlands Elementary. The school hosts an AAP (Advanced Academics Program) for students whose assessment scores qualify them for the highly capable program.

In 2017, Northshore Middle School was re branded and reworked from Northshore Junior High into Northshore Middle School, which made it a grade 6th to 8th school.

References

Public middle schools in Washington (state)
Educational institutions established in 1993
Schools in King County, Washington
1993 establishments in Washington (state)